
Bydgoszcz County is a unit of territorial administration and local government (powiat) in Kuyavian-Pomeranian Voivodeship, north-central Poland. It was created on 1 January 1999 as a result of the Polish local government reforms passed in 1998. Its administrative seat is the city of Bydgoszcz, although the city is not part of the county (it constitutes a separate city county).

As of 2019 its total population is 118,041, out of which the population of Solec Kujawski is 15,652, that of Koronowo is 11,162, and the rural population is 91,227.

Politics 

Voters elect a unicameral Bydgoszcz County Council consisting of a 21-members. The council is elected under proportional representation in free elections for a 4-year term.. Executive body is county executive board (zarząd powiatu) consists of five members elected by the council. The Board is headed by the starosta (Starosta Bydgoski).

Council districts 

Members of the council are elected from five districts, serve four-year terms. Districts does not have the constituencies formal names. Instead, each constituency has a number and territorial description.

Neighbouring counties 
Apart from the city of Bydgoszcz, Bydgoszcz County is also bordered by Tuchola County to the north, Świecie County and Chełmno County to the north-east, Toruń County to the east, Inowrocław County to the south, Żnin County to the south-west, Nakło County to the west, and Sępólno County to the north-west.

Administrative division 
The county is subdivided into eight gminas (two urban-rural and six rural). These are listed in the following table, in descending order of population.

References 
Polish official population figures 2019

 
Bydgoszcz